Santa Brigida is a comune (municipality) in the Province of Bergamo in the Italian region of Lombardy, located about  northeast of Milan and about  north of Bergamo.

Santa Brigida borders the following municipalities: Averara, Cassiglio, Cusio, Gerola Alta, Olmo al Brembo.

Demographic evolution

References